The Netherlands national under-20 rugby union team represent Netherlands in Rugby union in under-20 competitions. They play in the European Under-20 Rugby Union Championship, where their highest finish was a third place in 2019.

References

External links
 Rugby Netherlands Official Site
 Rugby Netherlands U20 Official pafe

European national under-20 rugby union teams
Rugby union